Sergio Contreras Pardo (born 27 April 1983), known as Koke, is a Spanish former professional footballer who played as a forward.

In a much-travelled career, he represented clubs in Spain, France, Portugal, Greece, the United States, Azerbaijan, Germany, Bolivia and India. He was best known for his tenure at Aris, which lasted six seasons over two separate spells.

Club career

Málaga
Born in Málaga, Koke started his football career at hometown club Málaga CF, being essential as the B team reached the Segunda División for the first time their history in 2003.

On 23 February 2003, he scored a late equaliser in a 1–1 home draw against RC Celta de Vigo in La Liga, where he appeared in six games, five from the bench, totalling 176 minutes for the Andalusians during the season.

Marseille

In January 2004, after seeing very little playing time in the first team, barred by veteran Salva, Koke joined Ligue 1 club Olympique de Marseille, playing ten times without scoring the remainder of the season. The following one was much better, with him netting five goals in 24 appearances.

In the 2005–06 campaign, with the arrival of Mamadou Niang (in August 2005) and Toifilou Maoulida (in January 2006), Koke was deemed surplus to requirements, scoring one goal in nine league matches and, in January 2006, was sent on loan to Sporting CP where he played almost no part in the club's season, although he did find the net twice as a substitute against Gil Vicente F.C. on 5 March, in a 2–0 home win.

Aris
The arrival – initially on loan – of Djibril Cissé in August 2006 meant the end of Koke's adventure in France. He would eventually sign for Aris Thessaloniki FC, a team that was filled with Spanish players, in a three-year deal. He produced the best football of his career in years, scoring ten league goals for a team that finished fourth in the league after being promoted the previous season.

In 2007–08, Koke netted another ten in Super League's regular season, adding one in the UEFA Cup group stage game against Red Star Belgrade. In July 2008, he signed a new five-year contract while also attaining vice-captaincy, second to Konstantinos Nebegleras, and becoming himself captain in the 2009–10 campaign.

Houston Dynamo
Koke signed with Major League Soccer club Houston Dynamo on 15 April 2011. He joined the team officially 11 days later, after being awarded his international transfer certificate.

On 29 April 2011, Koke made his debut for his new team, coming on as a late substitute in a 4–1 win against D.C. United. However, after failing to settle in Houston and struggling in the league, he had his contract termination request accepted by the club on 30 May, leaving the club after little more than a month.

Return to Spain
Koke returned to Spain in September 2011, signing with Rayo Vallecano, recently promoted to the top division. On 23 October, in his very first appearance, he scored his first goal for the Madrid club: after having replaced Piti midway through the second half of the away fixture against Real Betis, he netted the final 2–0 in the 88th minute through a penalty kick.

Koke was released in the 2012 January transfer window.

FK Baku
In February 2012, Koke joined Azerbaijan Premier League side FC Baku. He played a total of 15 matches in his only season and scored four goals, including one in the final of the Azerbaijan Cup which was won.

Koke was released in the summer.

Later years
On the last day of the 2013 January transfer window, Koke joined SSV Jahn Regensburg in the 2. Bundesliga. On 26 July, he changed teams and countries again, signing a one-year contract with Club Blooming from the Liga de Fútbol Profesional Boliviano.

On 15 September 2014, Koke moved to NorthEast United FC. He scored the game's only goal against the Kerala Blasters FC to mark his Indian Super League debut, and The Times of India subsequently wrote about the match: "The roar of the crowd could be heard a kilometre away from the Indira Gandhi Athletic Stadium".

On 11 September 2015, Koke was released on a free transfer and signed with Veria FC. The following month, without having appeared in any competitive matches, he re-joined former club Aris.

Personal life
In November 2019, Koke was arrested in Estepona on suspicion of heading a drugs ring. A total of 30 people including his brother and girlfriend were detained in the same operation; he left pre-trial detention in July 2021 by paying a €15,000 bond.

Career statistics

Club

Honours
Málaga
UEFA Intertoto Cup: 2002

Marseille
UEFA Intertoto Cup: 2005
Coupe de France runner-up: 2005–06

Aris
Greek Football Cup runner-up: 2007–08, 2009–10

FK Baku
Azerbaijan Cup: 2011–12

References

External links

1983 births
Living people
Spanish footballers
Footballers from Málaga
Association football forwards
La Liga players
Segunda División players
Segunda División B players
Tercera División players
Atlético Malagueño players
Málaga CF players
Rayo Vallecano players
Ligue 1 players
Olympique de Marseille players
Primeira Liga players
Sporting CP footballers
Super League Greece players
Aris Thessaloniki F.C. players
Veria F.C. players
Major League Soccer players
Houston Dynamo FC players
Azerbaijan Premier League players
FC Baku players
2. Bundesliga players
SSV Jahn Regensburg players
Bolivian Primera División players
Club Blooming players
Indian Super League players
NorthEast United FC players
Spanish expatriate footballers
Expatriate footballers in France
Expatriate footballers in Portugal
Expatriate footballers in Greece
Expatriate soccer players in the United States
Expatriate footballers in Azerbaijan
Expatriate footballers in Germany
Expatriate footballers in Bolivia
Expatriate footballers in India
Spanish expatriate sportspeople in France
Spanish expatriate sportspeople in Portugal
Spanish expatriate sportspeople in Greece
Spanish expatriate sportspeople in the United States
Spanish expatriate sportspeople in Azerbaijan
Spanish expatriate sportspeople in Germany
Spanish expatriate sportspeople in Bolivia
Spanish expatriate sportspeople in India